Claude Benton Gillingwater (August 2, 1870 – November 1, 1939) was an American stage and screen actor. He first appeared on the stage then in more than 90 films between 1918 and 1939, including the Academy Award-nominated A Tale of Two Cities (1935) and Conquest (1937). He appeared in several films starring Shirley Temple, beginning with Poor Little Rich Girl (1936).

Early life
Gillingwater was born in Louisiana, Missouri. Though he studied law, he preferred not to follow in his father's footsteps and become a lawyer. He became a travelling salesman for a wholesale firm, selling vinegar. While thus engaged, he joined a small theatrical company managed by David Belasco. Eight years later, Mary Pickford saw him act and secured him for her picture, Little Lord Fauntleroy (1921), which launched his film career.

Hollywood career
In later years, Gillingwater generally played curmudgeonly character roles. His best-known role is probably Jarvis Lorry in David O'Selznick's production of A Tale of Two Cities (1935). He also appeared in Mississippi (1935), The Prisoner of Shark Island (1936) and A Yank at Oxford (1938). He proved to be an excellent crabapple foil for 20th Century Fox moppet star Shirley Temple in Poor Little Rich Girl (1936) and subsequently appeared in Just Around the Corner (1938) and Little Miss Broadway (1938).

Later years and death
In February, 1936, while filming Florida Special (1936) at Paramount studios, he fell from a platform, resulting in a severe back injury from which he never fully recovered. His general health began to decline and his career was threatened. This, along with the death of his wife Carlyn in April 1937, left him extremely depressed.

On November 1, 1939, a housekeeper found Gillingwater dead, sitting in a chair inside a closet of his Beverly Hills, California home from a self-inflicted bullet wound to the chest. A suicide note stated he was worried about his failing health and the possibility of becoming an invalid. He did not want to become a burden to anyone, so he chose to take his own life. The death of the 69-year-old actor was officially ruled a suicide. His cremated remains were interred at the Columbarium of Prayer, Niche 10628, in The Great Mausoleum at Forest Lawn Memorial Park, Glendale, California. 

His son, Claude Gillingwater, Jr., was also an actor.

Partial filmography

Wild Primrose (1918) - Standish
Little Lord Fauntleroy (1921) - Earl of Dorincourt
My Boy (1921) - The Captain
Fools First (1922) - Denton Drew
Dust Flower (1922) - Steptoe
Remembrance (1922) - John P. Grout
 The Strangers' Banquet (1922) - Uncle Sam
The Christian (1923) - Lord Storm
 Crinoline and Romance (1923) - Col. Charles E. Cavanaugh
Alice Adams (1923) - Virgil Adams
Three Wise Fools (1923) - Theodore Findley
Dulcy (1923) - Mr. Forbes
A Chapter in Her Life (1923) - Mr. Everingham
Tiger Rose (1923) - Hector McCollins
Souls for Sale (1923) - Himself (uncredited)
Daddies (1924) - James Crockett
How to Educate a Wife (1924) - Henry Bancks
Madonna of the Streets (1924) - Lord Patrington
Idle Tongues (1924) - Judge Daniel Webster Copeland
A Thief in Paradise (1925) - Noel Jardine
Cheaper to Marry (1925) - Riddle
Winds of Chance (1925) - Tom Linton
Seven Sinners (1925) - 'Pious Joe' McDowell
We Moderns (1925) - Sir Robert Sundale
Wages for Wives (1925) - Jim Bailey
That's My Baby (1926) - John Raynor
Into Her Kingdom (1926) - Ivan (their tutor)
 For Wives Only (1926) - Professor von Waldstein
45 Minutes from Hollywood (1926, Short) - Old Man in Hotel Bed (uncredited)
Fast and Furious (1927) - Smithfield
Naughty but Nice (1927) - Judge J. R. Altewood
Barbed Wire (1927) - Jean Moreau
The Gorilla (1927) - Cyrus Townsend
Husbands for Rent (1927) - Sir Reginald Knight
The Little Shepherd of Kingdom Come (1928) - Major Buford
Women They Talk About (1928) - Grandfather Mervin
Oh, Kay! (1928) - Judge Appleton
Stark Mad (1929) - James Rutherford - Expedition Leader
Stolen Kisses (1929) - H.A. Lambert Sr.
Glad Rag Doll (1929) - Sam Underlane
Smiling Irish Eyes (1929) - Michael O'Connor
The Great Divide (1929) - Winthrop Amesbury
So Long Letty (1929) - Uncle Claude Davis
Dumbbells in Ermine (1930) - Uncle Roger
The Flirting Widow (1930) - Faraday
Kiss Me Again (1931) - Count de St. Cyr
Illicit (1931) - Ives Sr.
The Conquering Horde (1931) - Jim Nabours
Daddy Long Legs (1931) - Riggs
Gold Dust Gertie (1931) - John Aberdeen Arnold
Compromised (1931) - John Brock
Tess of the Storm Country (1932) - Frederick Garfield Sr
Ann Carver's Profession (1933) - Judge Bingham
The Avenger (1933) - Witt
Skyway (1933) - John Beaumont
I Loved a Woman (1933) - Banker (uncredited)
 Before Midnight (1933) - John Fry
You Can't Buy Everything (1934) - Banker Asa Cabot
The Show-Off (1934) - J.B. Preston
City Limits (1934) - Oliver
 Unknown Blonde (1934) - Papa Van Brunt, Sr.
In Love with Life (1934) - Morley
Green Eyes (1934) - Steven Kester
Back Page (1934) - Sam Webster
The Captain Hates the Sea (1934) - Judge Griswold
Broadway Bill (1934) - J.P. Chase
Strange Wives (1934) - Guggins
The Woman in Red (1935) - Grandpa Wyatt
Mississippi (1935) - General Rumford
Baby Face Harrington (1935) - Colton
Calm Yourself (1935) - Col. Allenby
Together We Live (1935) - Dick
A Tale of Two Cities (1935) - Jarvis Lorry Jr.
The Prisoner of Shark Island (1936) - Col. Jeremiah Milford Dyer
Florida Special (1936) - Simeon Stafford
Counterfeit (1936) - Tom Perkins
Ticket to Paradise (1936) - Robert Forbes
Poor Little Rich Girl (1936) - Simon Peck
Wives Never Know (1936) - Mr. Gossamer
Can This Be Dixie? (1937) - Col. Robert Peachtree
Top of the Town (1937) - William Borden
Conquest (1937) - Stephan (Marie's servant)
A Yank at Oxford (1938) - Ben Dalton
Little Miss Broadway (1938) - Judge
There Goes My Heart (1938) - Cyrus Butterfield
Just Around the Corner (1938) - Samuel G. Henshaw
Cafe Society (1939) - Old Christopher West

References

External links

 
 
 

1870 births
1939 deaths
20th-century American male actors
American male film actors
American male silent film actors
Male actors from Missouri
Suicides by firearm in California
People from Louisiana, Missouri
Burials at Forest Lawn Memorial Park (Glendale)
1939 suicides